"Incident On and Off a Mountain Road" is the premiere episode of the first season of Masters of Horror, directed by Don Coscarelli. It originally aired in North America on October 28, 2005. The screenplay is based on a short story by American author Joe R. Lansdale. It was first published as a comic book series, Masters of Horror #1-2, 4 issues.

Plot
While driving on a secluded mountain road, Ellen (Bree Turner) loses control of her vehicle and collides with an abandoned car on the side of the road. When checking to see if the other driver is all right, she finds a trail of blood leading into the forest. Following it, she encounters a deformed serial killer known as Moonface (John DeSantis), dragging the driver of the other vehicle. Narrowly escaping him, Ellen flees into the forest, with Moonface following her trail.

Through flashbacks spread throughout, she is shown receiving training from her survivalist husband Bruce (Ethan Embry), training her with both weapons and guerrilla tactics. She attempts to use these skills several times but despite her best efforts is still captured by the killer and taken to his workshop deep in the forest on a ridge overlooking a large waterfall.

After awakening in the basement—filled with the corpses of Moonface's previous victims—she encounters the delusional Buddy (Angus Scrimm), apparently insane but seemingly unharmed by Moonface. He speaks cryptically of the killer's methods and intent. Shortly thereafter, the killer comes downstairs, turning on a generator. Police sirens begin sounding as various lights around the room begin flashing. Lifting the other woman onto a large table—he uses a drill press to remove both of her eyes.

After Moonface leaves, Buddy talks Ellen into picking the lock on the chains binding her with a sharp object that had been jabbed into her shoulder. Buddy, who seemed to be tied up, suddenly stands up and begins shouting that Ellen is free. Moonface returns, and Ellen attacks Moonface and Buddy with a piece of wood. She runs upstairs where she is again attacked, but this time manages to overpower Moonface and knock him out a window. Looking out, she sees him dangling by a blanket several meters below, hanging above the waterfall. She watches as the fabric rips, turning away as he finally falls. Finding a gun, belt and boots, she leaves.

Returning to her car, she opens her trunk to reveal the body of her dead husband. In another flashback it is revealed that her husband had raped her during a brutal fight, shortly after which she strangled him with his own belt. Taking his body to Moonface's workshop, she removes his eyes and strings him up in the front yard in the same manner as Moonface's other victims. Before leaving she shoots Buddy, mimicking Moonface's "shh" gesture before killing him.

Cast
 Bree Turner as Ellen
 Angus Scrimm as Buddy
 John DeSantis as Moonface
 Ethan Embry as Bruce

Release

Home media

The DVD was released by Anchor Bay Entertainment on May 9, 2006. The episode was the first episode broadcast, but the third to be released on DVD. It includes a commentary with writer/director Don Coscarelli and writer Stephen Romano, as well as a number of featurettes. It also includes the first in a series of short documentaries on the director of the featured episode. The episode appears on the third volume of the Blu-ray compilation of the series.

Reception

Jon Condit from Dread Central rated the episode three and a half out of five, calling it "a generous and excellent start to an ambitious series." HorrorFreakNews rated it four out of five stars, praising the episode's pacing, cinematography, direction, and Turner's performance.

References

External links
 
 

2005 American television episodes
Masters of Horror episodes
American television series premieres
Television shows based on short fiction
Films based on short fiction
Works by Joe R. Lansdale

it:Episodi di Masters of Horror (prima stagione)#Panico sulla montagna